Adrian Cruz (born Adrian Alejandro Cruz; March 27, 1978) is an American screenwriter, producer and director. He is best known for creating Ascension TV mini-series and Splinter.

Biography

Cruz attended the USC School of Cinematic Arts, majoring in film and theater, and ever since his graduation has been working as a writer, director and actor. From 2004 to 2006, he was writer for Seed comics series published by Les Humanoïdes Associés. Adrian Cruz is a founding member of The Calamity Theater and a long-time member of The Evidence Room and Bootleg Theater.

Filmography

Adrian Cruz, together with Philip Levens, is creator of Ascension Canadian/American television miniseries. He is also screenwriter and director for Splinter feature movie from 2006. In 2008 Cruz directed Padua Playwrights A Thousand Words play, and in 2011 the Have you seen Alice? play written by Jacqueline Wright.

References

External links

American male screenwriters
American film directors
American television directors
American comics writers
1978 births
Living people
USC School of Cinematic Arts alumni